Pradeep Saman Kumara Undugoda Rupasinghage (born 29 June 1971) is a former Sri Lankan army officer, politician, former provincial councillor and Member of Parliament.

Undugoda was born on 29 June 1971. He was educated at Ananda College. He studied at General Sir John Kotelawala Defence University and has a postgraduate degree from the University of Moratuwa. He is studying for a PhD degree from the National University of Malaysia. He served in the Sri Lanka Light Infantry.

Undugoda was a member of the Western Provincial Council. He contested the 2020 parliamentary election as a Sri Lanka People's Freedom Alliance electoral alliance candidate in Colombo District and was elected to the Parliament of Sri Lanka.

References

1971 births
Alumni of Ananda College
Alumni of General Sir John Kotelawala Defence University
Alumni of the University of Moratuwa
Living people
Members of the 16th Parliament of Sri Lanka
Members of the Western Provincial Council
Sinhalese military personnel
Sinhalese politicians
Sri Lanka Light Infantry officers
Sri Lankan Buddhists
Sri Lanka People's Freedom Alliance politicians
Sri Lanka Podujana Peramuna politicians
United People's Freedom Alliance politicians